Abacillius is a genus of beetles in the family Carabidae, containing the following species:

 Abacillius aculeatus (Peringuey, 1896)
 Abacillius basilewskyi Straneo, 1962

References

Pterostichinae